{{Infobox person/Wikidata
| fetchwikidata = ALL
| name          = Mike Cannon-Brookes
| image         = Mike Cannon-Brookes Australian businessman.jpg
| image_size    = 220px
| caption       = Cannon-Brookes in 2018
| birth_name    = Michael Cannon-Brookes
| birth_date    = 
| birth_place   = New Haven, Connecticut, U.S.
| death_date    = 
| death_place   = 
| nationality   = Australian
| education     = Cranbrook School
| alma mater    = University of New South Wales
| employer      = Atlassian
| occupation    = 
| title         = 
| term          = 
| predecessor   = 
| successor     = 
| known for     = Co-founder and co-CEO, Atlassian (with Scott Farquhar)
| boards        = Atlassian
| networth      = {{ubl| 20.18 bn (Financial Review Rich List 2021)| 13.7 bn (Forbes list of Australia's 50 richest people 2021)}}
| spouse        = Annie Todd
| parents       = 
| children      = 
| relations     = 
| website       = 
}}

Michael Cannon-Brookes (born 17 November 1979) is an Australian billionaire, co-founder, and co-CEO of the software company Atlassian. Cannon-Brookes often carries the epithet of accidental billionaire after he and his business partner Scott Farquhar founded Atlassian with the aim of earning the then-typical graduate starting salary of 48,000 at the big corporations without having to work for someone else.

Early life
Cannon-Brookes was born in November 1979, the son of a global banking executive, also named Mike, and his wife, Helen. He attended Cranbrook School, Sydney, and graduated from the University of New South Wales with a degree in information systems on a UNSW Co-op Scholarship.

Career
With Scott Farquhar, Cannon-Brookes is the co-founder and co-CEO of Atlassian, a collaboration software company. The pair started the company in 2002, shortly after graduating from university, funding it with credit cards.

He is also an adjunct professor at the University of New South Wales' School of Computer Science and Engineering. Cannon-Brookes and Farquhar were recognised as the Australian IT Professional of the Year award in 2004, and Australian 2006 Entrepreneur of the Year. Cannon-Brookes was also honoured by the World Economic Forum as a Young Global Leader in 2009 and is a member of The Forum of Young Global Leaders.

In September 2020, it was revealed that Cannon-Brookes was listed on a Chinese Government "Overseas Key Individuals Database" of prominent international individuals of interest for China illustrating his prominence in the Australian technological and industry landscape. Cannon-Brookes has been a prolific commentator on public policy in Australia, collaborating with the Australian Government on a number of occasions, as well as publicly offering his assistance to solve energy and technology policy challenges.

In December 2020, Cannon-Brookes bought a minority stake in NBA team Utah Jazz, along with Qualtrics cofounder Ryan Smith.

In March 2022 it was reported that he and Andrew Forrest had invested in the  SunCable project, to build a solar and battery farm  in size at Powell Creek and a power-cable to link it to Singapore (via Indonesia) leaving Australia at Murrumujuk beach.

In May 2022 it was reported he was trying to buy Australian power supplier AGL with a view to converting them to green power generation ahead of their published schedule.

Personal life

Cannon-Brookes is married to Annie Todd and they have four children. In 2018 they bought Fairwater, Australia's most expensive house for approximately 100 million, next door to Scott Farquhar's 71 million Point Piper harbourside mansion, Elaine. Cannon-Brookes also acquired the 1923-built heritage residence Verona, designed by architect Leslie Wilkinson and located in Double Bay, for 17 million. The house previously belonged to New Zealand philanthropist Pat Goodman. Prior to that, in 2016 Cannon-Brookes bought the 7.05 million SeaDragon house, built in 1936, also designed by Wilkinson and updated by architect Luigi Rosselli. His Centennial Park home sold for 16.5 million. In 2019 he purchased a house near Fairwater for 12 million.

In July 2022, Annie Cannon-Brookes made a deal to buy Dunk Island off Mission Beach, Queensland. Reportedly, the transaction was between A$20–25m, with the intent to create a nature reserve and to revitalise the resort.

 Net worth 
Alongside his business partner, Farquhar, Cannon-Brookes debuted on the 2007 BRW Young Rich list of the richest Australians aged under 40; and on the BRW Rich 200 in 2013. In 2016, his net worth was estimated by Forbes on the list of Australia's 50 Richest people as 1.69 billion; by BRW Rich 200 as 2.00 billion; and by the Sunday Times Rich List as 906 million. , the Australian Financial Review estimated his net worth was 27.25 billion. Meanwhile, in the same month, Forbes'' estimated his net worth was 13.7 billion.

See also

List of NRL club owners

References

External links
 

1979 births
Living people
Australian billionaires
Businesspeople from Sydney
University of New South Wales alumni
People educated at Cranbrook School, Sydney
Atlassian people
Rugby league chairmen and investors
Rugby league people in Australia
National Basketball Association owners
Utah Jazz personnel
South Sydney Rabbitohs